Paikoro Local Government is one of the 774 Local Government Areas of Nigeria and one of 25 Local Government areas in Niger-State Nigeria. Paikoro Local Government headquarter is located in Paiko town about 25 km south-east of the state capital Minna.

It has an area of 2,066 km and a population of 158,086 at the 2006 census; projected to grow by 35% annually. 
Paikoro local government area is one of the 25 local government areas in Niger state Nigeria. It has its administrative headquarter situated in Paiko town. Paiko town is located in the south-eastern region of Niger State. Paikoro local government council oversees the public administration of Paikoro local government 11 wards and its Legislative council consisting of 11 councillors makes laws that governs the local government areas.
Paikoro local government area council consist of eleven (11) wards namely: Adunu, Chimbi, Gwam, Ishau, Jere, Kaffin Koro, Kwagana, Kwakuti, Nikuchi/Tungan Mallam, Paiko Central and Tutungo/Jedna.

The postal code of the area is 920.

References

Local Government Areas in Niger State